Sardhana is a constituency of the Indian Legislative Assembly, in the Uttar Pradesh region of India.

Members of Legislative Assembly

Election results

2022

2017

References

External links
 

Assembly constituencies of Uttar Pradesh
Politics of Meerut district